On November 6, 2018, the District of Columbia held an election for its non-voting House delegate representing the District of Columbia's at-large congressional district. The election coincided with the 2018 elections of other federal, state, and local offices.

The non-voting delegate is elected for a two-year term. Democrat Eleanor Holmes Norton, the incumbent delegate first elected in 1990, was re-elected for a 15th consecutive term.

Primary election
The primary election for party nominee was held on June 19, 2018.

Democratic primary
Incumbent Delegate Eleanor Holmes Norton faced her first primary challenge since 2010.  Her opponent in the primary was Kim Ford, a former Obama administration official. Holmes Norton defeated Ford with 76.5% to Ford's 22.9% in the Democratic primary on June 19, 2018.

Candidates
 Eleanor Holmes Norton, incumbent Delegate to the United States House of Representatives 
 Kim Ford, former Obama administration official

Democratic primary Results

Republican primary

Candidates
Nelson Rimensnyder, community activist

Libertarian primary

Candidates
 Bruce Majors, Libertarian activist, ran unopposed for his party's nomination

Libertarian primary results

D.C. Statehood Green primary

Candidates
 Natalie "Lino" Stracuzzi

Green Party primary result

Independent candidates
John Cheeks, businessman

General election
The election for Delegate for House of Representatives was held on Tuesday, November 6, 2018.

Results

See also
 United States House of Representatives elections in the District of Columbia

References

District of Columbia
2018
United States House of Representatives